You Don't Know Jack, derived from the phrase "you don't know jack shit", may refer to:

 You Don't Know Jack (franchise), a media franchise based on the trivia video game introduced in 1995
 You Don't Know Jack (1995 video game), the first title in the series
 You Don't Know Jack (game show), a 2001 televised game show based on the game
 You Don't Know Jack (2011 video game), a 2011 game in the series
 You Don't Know Jack (Facebook game), a Facebook derivative that was released in 2012
 You Don't Know Jack (film), a 2010 film about Jack Kevorkian, an American doctor known for a number of assisted suicides
 "You Don't Know Jack", a song by country music artist Luke Bryan
 You Don't Know Jack (Grimm), an episode of the television series Grimm

See also
"Senator, you're no Jack Kennedy", Lloyd Bentsen's retort to Dan Quayle in the 1988 Vice-Presidential Debate